Black Pine Peak, at  above sea level is a peak in the Black Pine Mountains of Idaho. No roads or trails go to the summit.

References 

Mountains of Idaho
Mountains of Cassia County, Idaho
Sawtooth National Forest